Arkaul (Arqawıl) is a rural locality (a village) in Urgushevsky Selsoviet, Karaidelsky District, Bashkortostan, Russia. The population was 4 as of 2010. There is 1 street.

Geography 
Arkaul is located 60 km southwest of Karaidel (the district's administrative centre) by road.

References 

Rural localities in Karaidelsky District